Dr. Frank J. Hayden Secondary School, is located in the northern area of Burlington, Ontario, Canada, at 3040 Tim Dobbie Drive. It is an English school in the Halton District School Board that  serves approximately 1600 grade 9-12 students. In its first year, Dr. Frank J. Hayden Secondary School served approximately 600 students in grades 9–10. The school is named for Special Olympics pioneer Frank Hayden.

Co-curricular programs
Dr. Frank J. Hayden has a wide variety of co-curricular programs, not called extracurriculars as that supports the notion that participating in clubs and teams is extra work, which is an idea that Hayden would like to discourage. Some of the clubs and teams that the school offers are:

Athletics

Arts
 Choir
 Jazz Band
 Wind Ensemble
 Sears Drama Festival
 Hayden Theatre
 Production Crew

Events at Hayden

The school's Social Justice Council organizes a Pink Day in October where students were encouraged to wear pink and donate to charities focused on and promoting awareness of breast cancer.
Hayden also hosts an annual Winter Semi Formal, organized by the Student Council. Student Council also orchestrates Inside Ride, a fundraiser to raise money for children with cancer by gathering sponsors and riding stationary bikes. Staff at Hayden coordinate an annual lip dub, where the student body lines the walls of Hayden and mouth the lyrics to a song to create a promotional video for future students.

Notable alumni
Myles Erlick

References

See also
Frank Hayden

Educational institutions established in 2013
2013 establishments in Ontario
High schools in Burlington, Ontario